On aura tout vu is a French comedy film directed by Georges Lautner and released in 1976.

Plot 
François Perrin (Pierre Richard), a photographer desirous to get into filming, wrote with his friend Henri, a script titled Le miroir de l'âme. Having not found any producer, François transmits the script to a producer of pornographic films, Bob Morlock (Jean-Pierre Marielle), who retitles the project into La vaginale. The only thing is that this setting becomes a source of conflict between François and his partner Christine (Miou-Miou).

Cast 
 Pierre Richard ... François Perrin, advertising photographer
 Jean-Pierre Marielle ... Bob Morlock, producer of pornographic films
 Miou-Miou ... Christine Lefèbvre, friend of François
 Gérard Jugnot ... Ploumenech, Morlock's assistant
 Henri Guybet ... Henri Mercier, pasta maker and co-author with François
 Renée Saint-Cyr : Madame Ferroni, director of the pasta brand "Ferroni"
 Sabine Azéma ... Claude Ferroni, the girl in love with Henri
 Jean Luisi ... Jules Slimane, the pornographic actor
 Valérie Mairesse ... Pierrette, an actress
 Michel Blanc ... himself
 Marie-Anne Chazel ... herself
 Christian Clavier ... himself
 Gérard Chambre ... Aldo, the pornographic actor
 Jean Michaud ... Monsieur Ferroni, director of the pasta brand "Ferroni"
 Maïtena Galli ... Mona Duroc, the pornographic actress
 Arlette Emmery ... Marie-France, Morlock's secretary
 Thierry Lhermitte ... the actor at the theater café

Notes on the film 
 Francis Veber and Georges Lautner have imagined this film at the advent of pornographic films in the United States.
 Engaging himself on the film, Pierre Richard refused at the same time to play in The Wing or the Thigh (1976) in which he was chosen to portray the role of Gérard Duchemin.
 The music theme of the film by Philippe Sarde, is very close from the one of the next film directed by Georges Lautner Death of a Corrupt Man (1977), also by Philippe Sarde.

External links 
 
 

1976 films
French comedy films
1976 comedy films
Films directed by Georges Lautner
Films scored by Philippe Sarde
Films about films
Gaumont Film Company films
1970s French films
Films with screenplays by Francis Veber